Nabesite is a rare silicate mineral of the zeolite group with the chemical formula Na2BeSi4O10·4(H2O). It occurs as colorless to white orthorhombic crystals in thin platy mica like sheets. It has the zeolite structure. Its Mohs hardness is 5 to 6 and its specific gravity is 2.16. The reported refractive index values are nα=1.499, nβ=1.507, and nγ=1.511.

It was discovered in the Ilimaussaq intrusive complex, of southwest Greenland, and first recognized in 2000. It occurs in tugtupite-bearing albitite, a rare highly alkaline igneous rock.

References 
Webmineral.com data
Mindat.org

External links
Structure type NAB

Sodium minerals
Beryllium minerals
Zeolites
Orthorhombic minerals
Minerals in space group 19